"She Ain't the Girl for You" is a song recorded by American country music duo The Kinleys.  It was released in April 2000 as the first single from the album II.  The song reached #34 on the Billboard Hot Country Singles & Tracks chart.  The song was written by Vince Melamed and Jon McElroy.

Chely Wright sings background vocals on the song.

Chart performance

References

2000 singles
2000 songs
The Kinleys songs
Songs written by Vince Melamed
Epic Records singles